Methionol (3-(Methylthio)-1-propanol) is a methyl sulfide derived from propan-1-ol. It is found in nature, including as a metabolite of yeast and bacillus anthracis. It is a sulphurous aroma component of many foods, such as wine, cheese and roasted coffee. It is classed as an irritant. It has a very low olfactory threshold.

References

Sulfides